Ezequiel Castillo is a male beach volleyball player from Dominican Republic, who participated  the 2006 NORCECA Men’s Beach Volleyball Continental Championship with Roberto de Jesús.

During the 2006 National Games in Dominican Republic, he won the silver medal at the beach volleyball competition, partnering Charlie Castillo.

At the Dominican Beach Tour 2008, he won a bronze medal, playing with Charlin Vargas.

He also earned a bronze medal with Sánchez Ramírez at the 2008 Dominican Republic Volleyball League playing indoor volleyball.

Clubs
  Sánchez Ramírez (2008)

References

 
 FEDOVOLI

Year of birth missing (living people)
Living people
Dominican Republic men's volleyball players
Dominican Republic beach volleyball players
Men's beach volleyball players